For description and history, see Solar cell

A solar cell (also called photovoltaic cell or photoelectric cell) is a solid state electrical device that converts the energy of light directly into electricity by the photovoltaic effect, which is a physical and chemical phenomenon. It is a form of photoelectric cell, defined as a device whose electrical characteristics, such as current, voltage or resistance, vary when exposed to light.

The following are the different types of solar cells.

 Amorphous Silicon solar cell (a-Si)
 Biohybrid solar cell
 Cadmium telluride solar cell (CdTe)
 Concentrated PV cell (CVP and HCVP)
 Copper indium gallium selenide solar cells (CI(G)S)
 Crystalline silicon solar cell (c-Si)
 Float-zone silicon
 Dye-sensitized solar cell (DSSC)
 Gallium arsenide germanium solar cell (GaAs)
 Hybrid solar cell
 Luminescent solar concentrator cell (LSC)
 Micromorph (tandem-cell using a-Si/μc-Si)
 Monocrystalline solar cell (mono-Si)
 Multi-junction solar cell (MJ)
 Nanocrystal solar cell
 Organic solar cell (OPV)
 Perovskite solar cell
 Photoelectrochemical cell (PEC)
 Plasmonic solar cell
 Polycrystalline solar cell (multi-Si)
 Quantum dot solar cell
 Solid-state solar cell
 Thin-film solar cell (TFSC)
 Wafer solar cell, or wafer-based solar cell crystalline 
 Non concentrated hetrogeneos PV cell

Solar cells
Silicon solar cells
Thin-film cells
Infrared solar cells
Silicon forms
Semiconductor materials